The Ontario State Bank Block was a historic commercial building located at 300 South Euclid Avenue in Ontario, California. The building, completed in 1887, was composed of three sections, and had a design which incorporated elements of the Eastlake and Queen Anne styles. The design included a corner turret, several gables along the roof line, and a variety of different window styles; it originally had three prominent oriel windows in the gable peaks above the bank's original section, and also had a set in the second section of the block. Decorative features included corbelled brickwork and carved wooden pilasters and brackets. The Ontario State Bank, which opened with the building, was the first bank in Ontario and an important early business center for the city. The building also housed several other shops, including Grand Palace Pavilion of Antiques, Howell's Furniture and Hardware, and E.H. Richardson's Pacific Electric Heating Company, which invented the Hotpoint electric iron and brought national attention to Ontario.

The building was added to the National Register of Historic Places on January 8, 1982. It unfortunately burned down in 1986.

Euclid Avenue is on the National Register of Historic Places.

See also 
 Frankish Building

References

Bank buildings on the National Register of Historic Places in California
Queen Anne architecture in California
Commercial buildings completed in 1887
National Register of Historic Places in San Bernardino County, California
Ontario, California